The 2016 Big East women's basketball tournament, officially known as the 2016 Big East championship, was a tournament from March 5 to 8 at McGrath-Phillips Arena in Chicago, Illinois. St. John's won their 4th Big East title for the first time since 1988 and earn an automatic trip to the NCAA women's tournament.

Seeds

Schedule

Source:

Bracket

See also
 2016 Big East men's basketball tournament

References

External links
Big East website

Big East women's basketball tournament